La Réale ("the royal") was a galley of the French galley corps, and the flagship of the French galley fleet under Louis XIV. She was designed by Jean-Baptiste Chabert, and built in Marseille between 1692 and 1694.

Status 
La Réale was termed a galère extraordinaire ("extraordinary galley") since she had a larger crew than normal fleet galleys.

The status of Réale was thus defined:

Legacy

The decorations of the stern are on display at the Musée de la Marine in Paris. The museum also features a contemporary model of an ordinary galley modified to look like the Réale.

See also
 Real (galley), a Spanish flagship galley.
 Mendam Berahi, a Malay flagship galley.

Notes

External links 
  Les galères du Roi-Soleil
  Ornements de poupe de la galère Réale

Ships built in France
1690s ships
Galleys of the French Navy